Winter is the second EP released by Jon Foreman, frontman of the San Diego rock band Switchfoot. The EP was released on Tuesday, January 15, 2008, as either a digital download or as a physical copy packaged with the Fall EP in a double-disc set.

Sound
Stylistically, this EP reflects a more experimental side to Foreman's songwriting. Whereas the Fall EP displayed a more straightforward approach musically, experimentation on Winter is much more evident. "White as Snow" toys with a slightly eastern influenced sound, while "In Love" carries a very oriental, and near-mantric feel—both new concepts in Foreman's music.  The feel of the album is indeed much more 'wintry', reflecting the dead of wintertime.

Commercial performance
The Fall & Winter CD combo debuted on the Billboard Top Heatseeker's chart at No. 24.

In popculture
"Behind Your Eyes" appeared in an episode of the TV Show, One Tree Hill

Track listing

References

2008 EPs
Jon Foreman albums